Malolo is an inhabited volcanic island in the Pacific Ocean, near Fiji. Malolo was used as a tribe name in Survivor: Ghost Island. Malolo Island is the largest of the Mamanuca Islands and is home to two villages.

History

Malolo was one of the locations surveyed by members the United States Exploring Expedition under Charles Wilkes in 1840.  During their visit, two members of the party, including Midshipman Wilkes Henry, Wilkes' nephew, were killed by natives as they attempted to negotiate for food.  In retaliation, 80 plus crewmen from the Expedition's ships attacked and destroyed the villages on Malolo, killing 87, and laid waste to all of the crops.

Tourism 
Malolo Island is home to five resorts: Tropica Island Resort, Malolo Island Resort, Likuliku Island Resort, 6 Senses Resort and Spa, and Funky Fish Resort.

Access
Malolo Island is accessible by boat or through the nearby Malolo Lailai Airport.

References

== External links ==

 Tropica Island Resort
 Tourism Fiji

Islands of Fiji
Ba Province
Mamanuca Islands